is a Japanese direct-to-video, serving as the sequel of 2006 Ultra Series Ultraman Mebius, taking place sometime after the final episode. Aside from original video work, it also received an expansion in the Televi-kun and Televi-Magazine publications in 2008.

Plot

STAGE I: The Legacy of Destruction
Sometime after Alien Empera's destruction and Mebius' departure, Ryu was promoted into GUYS captain, leading a bunch of rookies whereas the older members had retired. After recently destroying a Saramandora, the group separated to fight three different monsters, Roberuga, Mukadender and Cherubim. Not long after destroying Mukadender, Ryu and Haruzaki's ship were sucked into a strange fireball that brought them into a pocket dimension, which was revealed to be none other than the late Empera's ship, Darkness Fear. Alien Empera rode it as his transportation to Earth and was abandoned upon his arrival. But somehow, it was reactivated, and causing the series of monster appearances in the past month. With the Earth's safety at stake from its impact, the Darkness Fear could only be stopped from within. With no other choices, Sakomizu tried to participate in the mission until Toriyama stopped him, leaving this mission to the older Crew GUYS that he had just assembled.

Ryu's ship was struck with a trident, which was revealed to be the work of a samurai-themed monster. After he seemingly killed Ryu, the giant tied to chase Haruzaki until he was stopped by Ultraman Mebius. Mebius engaged in a battle against the armor but found himself slowly weakened. The armored giant fired Empera's Rezolium Ray, leading Haruzaki to theorize that the monster was Alien Empera. As the giant armor was about to finish Mebius, it was stopped by a sudden wave, which was revealed to have been caused by Ultraman Hikari. Having been trapped within the armor, he was only able to paralyze the fiend long enough for Mebius to take his sword and deliver a single blow before it was petrified. Out of exhaustion, he assumed his human form Mirai and met a guilt-ridden Haruzaki, believing that Ryu was killed due to his mistake.

STAGE II: The Immortal Wicked Armor
While both Cherubim and Roberuga were being dealt with, Mirai revealed to Haruzaki that Ryu survived the explosion. Ryu was briefly met by Ultraman King, later Hikari, who revealed that the giant armor's name was Armored Darkness, one of the Empera's vanguards. After his master's death, the sentient armor took control of Darkness Fear. Hikari tried to stop him but was consumed by the armor and can only paralyze it for short periods of time. The only way to rescue Hikari was for Ryu to make contact with the Ultraman. Ryu approached Mirai and Haruzaki, with the party reuniting with the older GUYS members. Once Armored Darkness began to move again, GUYS and Ultraman Mebius made their move, holding off the giant armor long enough for Ryu to enter the crack in his helmet and merge with Hikari. Hikari reawakened and burst out but Armored Darkness reformed and the Darkness Fear was about to approach the Earth. With the only way to stop it was to defeat the giant armor, both Ultra Warriors engaged in the fight but none of their attacks succeeded.

The older members of GUYS resonated with the Ultra Warriors, and the humans and Ultras merged, bringing forth Ultraman Mebius Phoenix Brave, who proceed to attack Armored Darkness with his own sword. After leaving a large slash on it, the combined Ultraman launch his attack and finally defeated the Armored Darkness but Darkness Fear descended faster than before. Hikari decided to bring the Darkness Fear to the Land of Light in hopes of safely disposing it, while Mebius teleported himself and the rest of Crew GUYS to safety. Mirai saw the Ultra Sign, saying that he was allowed to stay on Earth for a little longer, much to his friend's amusement.

Cast
 - 
 - 
 - 
 - 
 - 
 - 
 - 
 - 
 - 
 - 
 -

Voice cast
: 
Crew GUYS members: , 
: 
: 
:

Ending theme

Lyrics: Goro Matsui
Composition: Kisaburo Suzuki
Arrangement: Seiichi Kyoda
Artist: Project DMM (Verse 1, Stage I; Verse 2, Stage II)

References

Ultra Series films
Films based on television series
2008 direct-to-video films
2008 films
2000s Japanese films